María Cristina Martínez Córdoba is an Argentine lawyer. She represents the General Defendant of the Nation in the jury against José María Campagnoli, the prosecutor that investigated The Route of the K-Money.

References

21st-century Argentine lawyers
Living people
Year of birth missing (living people)
Argentine women lawyers